Lin Francis Kobangoye Ikinda (born 4 November 1990) is a Gabonese professional basketball player.  He currently plays for the Manga Basket club of the D1 Gabon league.

He represented Gabon's national basketball team at the 2015 AfroBasket, where he played most minutes for his team.

References

External links
 2015 Afrobasket Profile
 AfroBasket.com Profile

1990 births
Living people
Gabonese men's basketball players
People from Port-Gentil
Shooting guards
21st-century Gabonese people